The Washington Huskies men's soccer team is an intercollegiate varsity sports team of the University of Washington. The team is a member of the Pac-12 Conference of the National Collegiate Athletic Association.

Players and staff

Current roster

Head coach

Staff
The coaching staff as of May 2017 is as follows.

Yearly records

Rivalries 
Seattle U — The Seattle U Redhawks are the crosstown-rival of the Huskies. As of the conclusion of the 2016 season, Washington leads the series 44–6–5. Other rivalries include Seattle Pacific, Stanford, Portland, and Simon Fraser.

Seattle U

Notable alumni 

 Ely Allen
 Jason Boyce
 Mike Chabala
 Mason Robertson
 Kyle Coffee
 Raphael Cox
 Chris Eylander
 Jason Farrell
 Pete Fewing
 Justin Fiddes
 Joe Franchino
 Ty Harden
 Wes Hart
 Aaron Heinzen
 Josh Heard
 Dusty Hudock
 George John
 Zach Kingsley
 C. J. Klaas
 Bill May
 Chad McCarty
 Ellis McLoughlin
 James Moberg
 Taylor Peay
 Brandon Prideaux
 Brent Richards
 Spencer Richey
 Bryn Ritchie
 Cristian Roldan
 Ian Russell
 Justin Schmidt
 Billy Sleeth
 Andy Thoma
 Jaret Townsend
 Craig Waibel
 Matt Van Houten
 Dylan Teves
 Blake Bodily

Bibliography
 2011 Record Book

References

External links 

 

 
1963 establishments in Washington (state)
Association football clubs established in 1963